Podvelka is a village in northeastern Slovenia. It is the seat of the Municipality of Podvelka. It lies in the traditional region of Styria, but belongs to the Carinthia Statistical Region. The settlement is situated on the right bank of the Drava River on the railway line from Maribor to Dravograd.

References

External links
 
 Podvelka on Geopedia

Populated places in the Municipality of Podvelka